Dave Pierce (born October 24, 1972) is a Canadian songwriter, composer, producer and arranger. Pierce was the music director for the opening, closing, and victory ceremonies of the 2010 Winter Olympics in Vancouver, for which he received an Emmy Award for Outstanding Music Direction in 2010, arranger for Twyla Tharp's Frank Sinatra musical, Come Fly Away (opened March 2010) in New York at the Marquis Theatre on Broadway and later that year opening as Sinatra Dance With Me at the Wynn Las Vegas; and music director of the Calgary Stampede Evening Grandstand Show. Pierce was also the musical director of the 2009 Gemini Awards television show in Canada. He is the father of two daughters.

Pierce has worked with a variety of performers, including Michael Bublé, Loreena McKennitt, Petula Clark, Carrie Underwood, Paul Brandt, Ian Tyson, Jann Arden, Jorane, Bryan Adams, Sarah McLachlan, Nelly Furtado and K.d. lang. Pierce was commissioned to compose a symphonic work for Queen Elizabeth II.

Career

Dave Pierce was born in Drayton Valley, Alberta, Canada. An alumnus of Boston's Berklee College of Music (1992), Pierce returned to his native Canada and began working with entertainment producers developing many successful projects including Radio City Music Hall's Christmas Spectacular in New York City featuring The Rockettes, Grey Cup halftime shows for the Canadian Football League, television awards shows including Canada's Gemini Awards and The ACMA's in USA.

His credits range from musical theater, sporting and cultural events to commercial recordings and live mega spectacles. As an orchestrator, Pierce has adapted scores for hit Broadway National Tours including Chicago; The Music of Andrew Lloyd Webber Concert Tour, Thoroughly Modern Millie, 42nd Street, Crazy for You, Dr. Dolittle, and Annie Get Your Gun.

The stars of Cirque du Soleil perform their acts to Pierce's compositions throughout the world. Clients include ABC, CBS, Madison Square Garden, 19 Entertainment, Macy's Parade, Arista Records, Tropicana Resorts, Clear Channel Europe, Disney, Bayer, Fashion Television, Norwegian Cruise Lines, Troika Entertainment, the Government of Canada, BMG and Universal Music. He regularly works in major markets such as New York, L.A., Nashville, Chicago, Toronto and Vancouver.

Vancouver 2010

Pierce was the director of music for the 2010 Olympics in Vancouver, British Columbia, Canada. His compositions were used as the underpinning of the opening and closing ceremonies as well as the daily medals presentations. Pierce produced the CD Sounds of Vancouver 2010: Opening Ceremony Commemorative Album which sold Gold, he also produced Sounds of Vancouver 2010: Closing Ceremony Commemorative Album. Each CD features artists from the ceremonies including Bryan Adams, Nelly Furtado, K-os, Michael Bublé, Sarah McLachlan, Nickelback, Alanis Morissette, Donald Sutherland, Garou, and opera singers Measha Brueggergosman and Ben Heppner. One pre-recorded segment featuring a performance of Samuel Barber's Adagio for Strings was conducted in the studio by ballet maestro Earl Stafford, otherwise Pierce conducted all of the recording orchestras as well as the opening ceremony live on-stage orchestra (known as the 2010 Vancouver Olympic Orchestra, per the album). Pierce utilized a unique approach to producing the recordings for the Games which employed over 300 musicians and provided a cross-genre score that included Canadian indigenous musicians, symphonic instrumentalists and players from the worlds of jazz, punk, rock, R&B, folk and country.

References

External links 
 
 
 
 

1972 births
Living people
Musicians from Alberta
Canadian composers
Canadian male composers